The European Archery Championships is an archery outdoor/indoor and .... championship in Europe.

Championships 
1968-2012:  European Mediterranean Archery Championships

2014-2022:  European Archery Championships

European and Mediterranean Archery Union (EMAU) = 17 April 1988

World Archery Europe (WAE) = 20 May 2012

Outdoor
European Outdoor Target Championship

Indoor
European & Mediterranean Indoor Archery Championship

Field (Senior/Junior)

3D

Para
European Para-Archery Championships

Youth

Ski Archery

University
European Universities Championships

Crossbow
https://www.worldcrossbow.com/

3rd European Crossbow Championship 2009

Field Crossbow European Championships 2013 Innsbruck

Medals

References

Results 
 Winners
 http://www.archeryeurope.org/
 http://www.emau.org/
 History
 http://www.sport-komplett.de/sport-komplett/sportarten/b/bogenschiessen/_historie.htm
 http://www.sport-komplett.de/sport-komplett/sportarten/b/bogenschiessen/hst/62.html
 http://www.sport-komplett.de/sport-komplett/sportarten/b/bogenschiessen/hst/23.html
 http://www.sport-komplett.de/sport-komplett/sportarten/b/bogenschiessen/hst/72.html
 http://www.sport-komplett.de/sport-komplett/sportarten/b/bogenschiessen/hst/75.html
 https://worldarchery.sport/competition/189/european-outdoor-archery-championship

External links 
EMAU
 Results

 
Archery competitions in Europe
European championships
Recurring sporting events established in 1968
1968 establishments in Europe
International archery competitions